Dmytro Arkadiyovych Nazarov (born 3 August 1977) is a former Ukrainian-Russian football defender. He was in Tavriya from 1994 to 2002, and also played for Metalurh Mariupol, Ihroservice Simferopol, and PFC Sevastopol. Nazorov also played for the Ukrainian U-16 team in 1993.

In 2014, after the annexation of Feodosia, Crimea to Russia, he received a Russian citizenship as Dmitriy Arkadyevich Nazarov.

External links 
Profile on Official Tavriya website 

Living people
1977 births
People from Feodosia
Ukrainian footballers
SC Tavriya Simferopol players
FC Mariupol players
FC Ihroservice Simferopol players
FC Sevastopol players
Crimean Premier League players
Crimean Premier League managers
Association football defenders
Naturalised citizens of Russia
Russian footballers
Ukrainian football managers